State Route 116 (SR 116) is a  long north-south state highway in the mountains of East Tennessee. The highway runs from its junction with SR 62 at its southern end between Wartburg and Coalfield in Morgan County, to its northern end at Caryville, Tennessee in Campbell County.

Route description
From its southwestern terminus it heads northeast and passes through the town of Petros and past Brushy Mountain State Penitentiary.

Continuing northeast into Anderson County (along a mountain pass known locally as Petros Mountain), the highway then passes through remote mountainous country known for its many former coal mining villages, some of which were company towns and are now essentially ghost towns.  Among them are the towns (or former towns) of Fork Mountain, Buffalo, Devonia (a/k/a Moore's Camp), Braytown, Rosedale, and Charley's Branch.  The Devonia post office which served this entire region was closed in 1975.  Once the mines in these towns closed down with the resulting loss of population, the towns' schools were closed and remaining students were consolidated into the Rosedale school, which saw steadily falling enrollment and was closed in the 1990s.  This section of SR 116 parallels the New River and the former line of the Tennessee Railroad.  There are many abandoned underground coal mines, coal tipples, and railroad yards and sidings along this section of SR 116.  Despite the end of most underground mining and the demise of the towns along this portion of the highway, a great deal of strip mining continues however.

SR 116 briefly passes into Campbell County and then turns southeast back into Anderson County.  From there it passes through the village of Stainville (more commonly known as Ligias Fork) and continues southeast through some remote, sparsely populated mountains (along a very long and steep mountain pass locally known as Graves Gap) to Laurel Grove.  There it turns northeast again at the junction with Frost Bottom Road, since 1982 designated as SR 330.  This section of the highway parallels Walden Ridge to the immediate southeast, and a former spur of the Norfolk Southern Railway (now closed), and passes through Briceville, Fraterville which was the site of a 1902 mine explosion, "The Wye" near the former mining camp of Beech Grove, and finally through a gap in Walden Ridge to enter Rocky Top.

Originally the northeastern terminus of SR 116 was in Rocky Top at the junction with US 25W.  About 1982, SR 116 was extended northward to Caryville to incorporate the portion of the former US 25W between Rocky Top and Caryville superseded by I-75.  This addition to Route 116 parallels the busy railroad lines of both the CSX and Norfolk Southern, and I-75 immediately to the west as it passes through the community of Vasper.

Petros, Briceville, Rocky Top, and Caryville are the only towns of any sizeable population today along Route 116.

History
The highway has had a high rate of accidents, including fatal accidents, attributed to conditions including narrow shoulders, numerous curves, unstable slopes, rockfall hazards, and absence of guardrails. In 2013, the Tennessee Department of Transportation announced plans for $1.2 million in roadway improvements, including widening of shoulders and addition of guardrails, pavement markings and signs.

Junction list

References

External links
 The Complete Devil's Triangle aka Brushy Mountain Prison Run - Motorcyclists' travelogue of Route 116
 Devil's Triangle - Motorcyclists' travelogue of Route 116

116
Transportation in Morgan County, Tennessee
Transportation in Anderson County, Tennessee
Transportation in Campbell County, Tennessee